Molise Is a region in Southern Italy.

Molise may also refer to:
Contado di Molise, a Neapolitan giustizierato
Molise, Campobasso, a commune in the Province of Campobasso, Italy